The Penn State Nittany Lions women's lacrosse team is an NCAA Division I college lacrosse team representing Pennsylvania State University as part of the Big Ten Conference. They play their home games at Panzer Stadium in State College, Pennsylvania.

Coach

The Nittany Lions have been coached by Missy Doherty since 2011. Doherty was a 1997 graduate of the University of Maryland, where she won 3 national titles and amassed a 68-2 record playing lacrosse there. She spent time as an assistant coach at Vanderbilt, Brown, and Princeton from 1998-2003, playing an important part of Princeton's back-to-back national titles in 2002 and 2003. In 2004 she became head coach at Towson, and the next year led the Tigers to their first NCAA tournament appearance in school history, which resulted in a one-goal loss to #5 Georgetown in the first round. Doherty's Tigers made three more appearances in 2008, 2009, and 2010 before she moved to State College in 2011 to coach the Nittany Lions. While at Towson she amassed a 79-46 record.

After a rebuilding 2011 season, Doherty led Penn State to the NCAA Tournament for the first time in seven years in 2012, and the quarterfinal for the first time in thirteen years as well. Penn State has made seven straight NCAA Tournament appearances under her watch from 2012-18, including five quarterfinals and back-to-back Final Fours in 2016 and 2017.

Historical statistics
*Statistics through 2018 season

Individual career records

Reference:

Individual single-season records

Seasons

Postseason Results

The Nittany Lions have appeared in 24 NCAA tournaments. Their postseason record, not counting third place games, is 23-22.

References

External links
Official website